The 1978 Currie Cup was the 40th edition of the Currie Cup, the premier annual domestic rugby union competition in South Africa.

Fixtures and Results

Final

See also

 Currie Cup

References

1978
1978 in South African rugby union
1978 rugby union tournaments for clubs